Hambol Region is one of the 31 regions of Ivory Coast. Since its establishment in 2011, it has been one of two regions in Vallée du Bandama District. The seat of the region is Katiola and the region's population in the 2021 census was 612,029.

Hambol is currently divided into three departments: Dabakala, Katiola, and Niakaramandougou.

Notes

 
Regions of Vallée du Bandama District
States and territories established in 2011
2011 establishments in Ivory Coast